SSCE may refer to:

 Senior Secondary Certificate of Education, Australia
 Senior Secondary Certificate Examination, Nigeria
 Society for the Study of Christian Ethics, United Kingdom
 Sri Sairam College of Engineering, Bangalore, Karnataka, India
 Solid Surface Combustion Experiment, carried out on several NASA flights, e.g. STS-54
 Sequential sector conjunctival epitheliectomy; see Limbal stem cell deficiency